The Tracker is a 2002 Australian drama film/meat pie Western directed and written by Rolf de Heer and starring David Gulpilil, Gary Sweet and Damon Gameau. It is set in 1922 in outback Australia where a colonial policeman (Sweet) uses the tracking ability of an Indigenous Australian tracker (Gulpilil) to find the alleged murderer of a white woman.

Plot
1922, somewhere in Australia. An Aboriginal man is accused of murdering a white woman, and three white men (The Fanatic, The Follower and The Veteran) are on a mission to capture him with the help of an experienced indigenous man (The Tracker).

As they travel through the rugged Australian outback, each suffers under the stern hand The Fanatic, who will stop at nothing to bring the accused to justice, even if that means sacrificing the others to reach the goal.

Meanwhile, the motives of the tracker remain elusive, and despite their relentless pursuit the men always seem to be a half-day behind their quarry.

After the death of one of the men, and a surprise mutiny, what endgame awaits for the group, and the enigmatic Tracker to which they have entrusted their survival.

Cast
David Gulpilil as The Tracker
Gary Sweet as The Fanatic
Damon Gameau as The Follower
Grant Page as The Veteran
Noel Wilton as The Fugitive

Production
The film was shot in the semi-arid, rugged Arkaroola Sanctuary, in South Australia's Flinders Ranges. De Heer used an intentionally small film crew, saying that "It's all a much better process ...". The film is intercut with paintings by Peter Coad which portray brutal actions not shown, while the lyrics of the soundtrack (written by De Heer) form part of the narrative, and are sung by Archie Roach with music composed by Graham Tardif.

Reception
On review aggregator Rotten Tomatoes the film has a score of  based on reviews from  critics, with an average  rating. Based of 16 critics on Metacritic, the film have a score of 71 out of a 100, indicating "generally favorable reviews".

Film critic Roger Ebert gave the film three-and-a-half stars out of four calling the film "haunting" and the performances "powerful". David Stratton described the film as "remarkable".

Walter Addiego of the San Francisco Chronicle wrote "See the film mainly for the quiet and powerful work of Gulpilil in the title role". Slant Magazines Jay Antani was quoted saying "The Tracker is the first significant movie to find its way into American theaters in 2005".

Awards and nominations

Soundtrack

A Soundtrack was released in August 2002. The album is credited to Australian musician Archie Roach. The soundtrack won best soundtrack at the 2002 Film Critics Circle of Australia.

At the ARIA Music Awards of 2002, the album was nominated for ARIA Award for Best Original Soundtrack, Cast or Show Album

Track listing 
"Wide Open Spaces" (instrumental) - 1:20
"Far Away Home" - 3:41
"Trouble Coming" - 2:22
"Approaching" (instrumental) - 0:29
 "My People" - 3:49
"After the Valley of Sorrow" (instrumental) - 0:29
"All Men Choose the Path They Follow" - 5:16
"Walk to Destiny" (instrumental) - 1:45
"The Chain" - 2:18
"A Spear" (instrumental) - 1:05
"Contradiction" - 2:02
"Life Matters" - 0:44
"Friction" (instrumental) - 1:15
"Gungalaria" - 3:16
"Hanging Tree" (instrumental) - 0:40
"My History" - 3:45
"Drowning" (instrumental) - 2:02
"Hope Always" - 4:27

Release history

See also
Cinema of Australia
South Australian Film Corporation
List of Australian films

References

External links

The Tracker at the National Film and Sound Archive
The Tracker at Vertigo Productions
The Tracker at Oz Movies

2002 films
Australian Western (genre) films
Archie Roach albums
APRA Award winners
2002 Western (genre) films
Films shot in Flinders Ranges
Films directed by Rolf de Heer
Films about Aboriginal Australians
2000s chase films
Films set in 1922
Films set in the Outback
2000s English-language films